Doc. Dr. Ing. Vladimír Valach, CSc. (born 26 April 1937 in Tekovské Nemce, Slovakia - died 5 March 2006 in Bratislava, Slovakia) was a Slovak diplomat, economist and writer, who significantly contributed to the development of Slovak banking sector and French-Slovak relations.

Vladimír Valach studied at the University of Economics in Prague (1955 to 1960). Between 1968-1976 he worked as a branch manager of the commercial banking arm of the State Bank of Czechoslovakia in Bratislava. Subsequently he held the post of a deputy general director of the State Bank. In the 1990s, Valach capitalized on his experience in the field of banking and monetary policy, when he was named the first vice-governor of the CNB's Emission bank in Prague. He contributed to the transition process of the Czechoslovak koruna to a currency with internal and later external convertibility (3 devaluations of koruna at the beginning of the 1990s), as well as during the separation of currencies after the break-up of the federation and the subsequent creation of Slovak koruna.

In the 1990s he was involved in the creation of the Slovak Guarantee Bank as a first bank of its kind in the ČSFR. He also participated in the creation of Credit Lyonnais Bank Slovakia, became its general manager and at the same time the president of its Board of Trustees. Vladimír Valach was a founding president of the French-Slovak Chamber of Commerce and was able to utilize his positive relation with France in 1997, when he was made the Slovak ambassador in Paris. He served as the ambassador until 2001, when he was replaced by Mária Krasnohorská.  For his work and contribution to the development of Slovak-French relations he was awarded the title of the Knight of Légion d'honneur of the French Republic. In Slovakia he continued working towards the development of the country's banking sector and at the beginning of the 21st century Valach held the position of the Director of the Slovak Bank Association, which contributed to his position as an expert on Slovak economy. At the same time he dedicated his time to lecturing on diplomacy at the School of International Relations of the University of Economics in Bratislava and literary work.

Vladimír Valach died on 5 March 2006 in Bratislava.

Works 

Professional publications
 Nové dimenzie rizík na zahraničných trhoch a devízová návratnosť (New dimensions of risks in foreign markets and return of foreign exchange), 1981
 Riziká na zahraničných trhoch a devízová návratnosť (Risks in foreign markets and return of foreign exchange), 1986
 Adaptácia - kritérium úspešnosti ekonomiky (Adaptation - a criterion for the success of economy), 1990
 Medzinárodné hospodárske vzťahy v kapitalizme (International economic relations in capitalism), 1986 - coauthor
 Medzinárodný platobný styk a menové vzťahy (International payment and monetary relations), 1997 - coauthor

Other
 Paris - Bratislava, alebo, Prečo mám rád Francúzsko? (Paris - Bratislava, or why I like France), 2002
 Paris - Bratislava, ou, Pourquoi j'aime la France? (Paris - Bratislava, or why I like France), 2005

References

External links 
 http://www.osobnosti.sk/index.php?os=zivotopis&ID=58894
 http://www.snk.sk/

1937 births
2006 deaths
Slovak writers
Slovak diplomats
European Union diplomats
Ambassadors of Slovakia to France
Slovak officials of the European Union